The Southern Alberta Jubilee Auditorium is a performing arts, culture and community facility located in Calgary, Alberta, Canada.

The auditorium was built in 1955 to celebrate the 50th anniversary of Alberta. It is owned and operated by the Government of Alberta.

The Jubilee is home to Calgary Opera, Alberta Ballet, and the annual Canadian Legion Remembrance Day Ceremonies. For many years it has hosted touring Broadway shows, stand-up comedians, theatre productions, bands, orchestras, dance festivals and awards ceremonies. Other tenants include Broadway Across Canada.

In 2005 as part of the celebrations for the Alberta Centennial, the auditorium underwent extensive renovations totalling $91 million.

The main theatre capacity to up 2,523 people on three levels. Renovations beginning in 2004 focused on extensive improvements including: acoustics, seating, climate controls, and a revitalized new look.

See also
Northern Alberta Jubilee Auditorium

References

Further reading

External links
SAJA Website

Performing arts centres in Canada
Buildings and structures in Calgary
Theatres in Alberta
Music venues in Calgary
Tourist attractions in Calgary
Badminton venues
Badminton in Canada
Historic buildings in Calgary
1955 establishments in Alberta
Theatre in Calgary